Jason Michael Finch (born 27 September 1969) is an English former cricketer. Finch played as a right-handed batsman, who began as a wicket-keeper and went on to play List A cricket as a batsman and an off-break bowler. He was born at Hastings, Sussex

Finch played for Sussex County Cricket Club's Second XI, including in fixtures against Oxford and Cambridge University and the Combined Services in 1990 and 1991, and for Sussex Cricket Board in three List A matches in 2001 and 2002. Growing up, Finch played in all the Sussex age groups and was selected for England under-15 and under-17 sides. In 1998 he played for the British Police. Finch played club cricket for Hastings and St Leonards Priory Cricket Club in the Sussex Cricket League where he has won seven premier league titles.

His son, Harry Finch, has played first-class cricket for Sussex and Kent County Cricket Clubs.

References

External links
Jason Finch at Cricinfo

1967 births
Living people
Sportspeople from Hastings
English cricketers
Sussex Cricket Board cricketers